Marie-Claire Daveluy (August 15, 1880 – January 21, 1968) was a Canadian librarian, historian and writer. She is considered a pioneer in library science in Canada.

Biography
The daughter of Georges Daveluy and Marie Lesieur Desaulniers, she was born in Montreal, Quebec, and was educated at the Hochelaga Convent. She earned a degree in library science at McGill University in 1920. At the Bibliothèque municipale de Montréal, she was assistant librarian from 1920 to 1943 and head of cataloguing from 1930 to 1941. In 1937, with Aegidius Fauteux, she founded the École de bibliothécaires at the Université de Montréal and served as its chair for several years. She also helped found the Association canadienne des bibliothécaires de langue française in 1943. She hosted a weekly program of historical sketches on Radio-Canada from 1943 to 1948. Her novels for youth combined Canadian history with romantic fiction. She also published a number of fairy tales including Le Filleul du roi Grolo, Sur les ailes de l'oiseau bleu and Une Révolte au pays des fées.

She was the first woman to become a member of the Montreal Historical Society. In 1934, she received the Prix de l'Académie Française and a second Prix David for Jeanne-Mance, 1606-1673.

She died in Montreal at the age of 87 and was entombed at the Notre Dame des Neiges Cemetery in Montreal.

References

External links

 Fonds Marie-Claire Daveluy (R11856) at Library and Archives Canada

1880 births
1968 deaths
Canadian librarians
Canadian women librarians
Canadian women children's writers
20th-century Canadian historians
Canadian women non-fiction writers
Canadian women historians
Historians from Quebec
Writers from Montreal
Burials at Notre Dame des Neiges Cemetery
Canadian children's writers in French